Morris Rees III House, also known as George McKown House and Springvale, is a historic home located near Gerrardstown, Berkeley County, West Virginia. It was built about 1805 and is a two-story, three bay, gable roofed stone house in the Federal style. It sits on a cut stone foundation and features a one-story, one bay portico supported by Tuscan order columns. The portch was built about 1980 and is a replica of the original.  Also on the property are a frame kitchen / living quarters (c. 1850), a frame stable (c. 1900), a barn (c. 1890), tractor shed (c. 1900), a stone spring house (c. 1805), a cinder block garage (c. 1950), and a metal grain bin (c. 1909).

It was listed on the National Register of Historic Places in 2003.

References

Federal architecture in West Virginia
Houses completed in 1805
Houses in Berkeley County, West Virginia
Houses on the National Register of Historic Places in West Virginia
National Register of Historic Places in Berkeley County, West Virginia
Stone houses in West Virginia
1805 establishments in Virginia